The song "See The U.S.A. In Your Chevrolet" (title as filed for 1950 copyright) is a commercial jingle from c. 1949, with lyrics and music by Leo Corday (ASCAP) and Leon Carr (ASCAP), written for the Chevrolet Division of General Motors.  The song was the Chevrolet jingle sung on the show Inside U.S.A. with Chevrolet by Chevrolet's real-life husband-wife duo, Peter Lind Hayes and Mary Healy, years before it became associated with Dinah Shore through Chevrolet's decade-long sponsorship of her television shows. Dinah Shore sang the song after 1952, and it became something of a signature song for her. Later the song was also sung by male spokesman Pat Boone on his Pat Boone-Chevy Showroom (ABC) from 1957 through 1960. When the games of the Los Angeles Dodgers were televised in the 1960s, commercials were aired with the song sung by baseball players John Roseboro and Don Drysdale, whose singing careers, announcer Vin Scully said, were "destined to go absolutely nowhere."

Missing punctuation, the song is also titled as "See the USA in Your Chevrolet" on IMDb.  The title has been catalogued for ASCAP since year 2001, as "See The U S A In Your Chevrolet (Chevrolet)" (listed without publisher in the 2001 ASCAP ACE Database).

Adaptations
Over the years, this song has also been customized by local Chevrolet dealerships, incorporating the dealer name, brands and/or area they service. One example can be found in Honolulu, Hawaii, where The JN Automotive Group used the Dinah Shore commercial footage in a 2011 TV commercial that featured their customers singing the song.

Automotive dealership Ellis Brooks Chevrolet (now Ellis Brooks Auto Center) in San Francisco, California adapted the song into "See Ellis Brooks Today for Your Chevrolet". The radio and television advertisement became iconic throughout the San Francisco Bay Area.

In popular culture 
On February 6, 2011, during Fox's coverage of Super Bowl XLV, the cast of Glee did a cross-promotion with Chevrolet which involved Sue Sylvester enticing the glee club to do a commercial in which they would receive a Chevrolet Cruze if they participated, knowing that doing so would disqualify the New Directions from competing in any contests. Although the song was used in a dream sequence that involved a big budget production number, the group (in reality) declined Sue's bribe upon Rachel Berry's realization of Sue's ulterior motive, which had previously caused trouble for the Glee club in a season 1 episode, "Mattress". Chevrolet ran several Super Bowl advertisements, one of which was this 30-second ad. The ad served as a teaser for a 2-minute and 20 second ad featuring the Glee cast as singers and dancers during a Lea Michele-led rendition of "See the USA in Your Chevrolet" that aired during the Super Bowl lead-out program, which was "The Sue Sylvester Shuffle" episode of Glee. A 60-second version of the ad was aired along with movie trailers at nationwide movie theaters.  The commercial was also to promote the 2011 Glee Live! In Concert! tour. The "See the USA" ad was directed by Alfonso Gomez-Rejon. Russell Carpenter was the director of photography.

References

1949 songs
Chevrolet
Television music
Pat Boone songs
Road transportation in the United States
Songs about cars
Songs used as jingles
Songs with music by Leon Carr